William Picton Mortimer (1833 – 22 December 1916) was an English first-class cricketer and British Army officer.

Mortimer was born in 1833, one of twenty children of Edward Horlock Mortimer and his wife, Frances Lardner. He made one appearance in first-class cricket for the Surrey Club against the Marylebone Cricket Club at Lord's in 1853. He batted in both Surrey Club innings', being dismissed without scoring by Jemmy Dean in their first-innings, while in their second-innings he was dismissed by James Grundy. He served in the British Army with the 80th Regiment of Foot in British India, later serving with the 11th Hussars, where he held the rank of lieutenant colonel. He died at Cheltenham in December 1916.

References

External links

1833 births
1916 deaths
English cricketers
Surrey Club cricketers
South Staffordshire Regiment officers
11th Hussars officers
English military personnel
19th-century British Army personnel